Buran Joshua Parks (born 27 June 1992) is a South African rugby union player for the  in the Currie Cup and the Rugby Challenge. His regular position is loose-forward.

Career

References

South African rugby union players
Living people
1992 births
People from George, South Africa
SWD Eagles players
Rugby union flankers
Rugby union players from the Western Cape